Yuanxiao (Yuánxiāo ) is a dumpling of glutinous rice flour, filled with sesame or peanut powder, and sugar, or sweet adzuki bean paste, eaten in a soup, during the Lantern Festival, the fifteenth day of the Chinese New Year. It is similar to Tangyuan, but is traditionally prepared in a basket, and served mainly in Northern China.

See also 
Lantern festival tradition

References

External links

Chinese cuisine
Chinese desserts
Lantern Festival